The Martyrs of La Florida (d. 1549–1706) were a group of Native American and Spanish Catholics killed in Florida during the Spanish Empire's colonial expansion into North America. The group of 86 individuals includes a number of priests and laypeople, killed by Native Americans and subjects of the British Empire. The lead martyr of the cause is the Native American layman Antonio Cuipa. Fr Luis Cáncer, OP is among the others killed, alongside a number of Dominicans, Jesuits, Franciscans, and various laypeople. 

Their cause for canonization was opened in 2015 by Bishop Gregory Parkes of the Diocese of Pensacola–Tallahassee, along with support from bishop representatives in the dioceses of St. Augustine, St. Petersburg, Orlando, Palm Beach and Venice. The United States Conference of Catholic Bishops has also endorsed the cause.

History 
During the period of the Spanish Empire's expansion into the New World, various Catholic settlements were established in North America, including a number extending into what would become the United States. Among these were the settlements in Spanish Florida, where the first permanent one was St. Augustine, Florida. 

Soon a free Black Catholic fort was established nearby, Gracia Real de Santa Teresa de Mose, for Africans escaping British enslavement in the provinces of Georgia and South Carolina. They would later serve as a garrison defending the Spanish territories from invasion—of which a number would occur, taking the lives of numerous inhabitants.

During this era, various conflicts arose between the local Native populations and the encroaching colonists and Catholic missionaries, resulting in clashes and not a few deaths. British attacks also killed a number of civilians, as well as religious personages. Altogether, 86 Catholics were later recognized as having been killed in a fashion that would qualify them to be martyrs of the Church. The Catholic bishops leading the canonization cause chose to have a Native American serve as the lead martyr of the effort, Antonio Cuipa. Fr. Luis de Cáncer was also among those killed, alongside Dominicans, Jesuits, Franciscans, and various laypeople.

In 1743, Pope Clement XI and King Philip V of Spain declared October 3 as a feast day for the martyrs. Their official cause for canonization was opened in 2015 by Bishop Gregory Parkes of the Diocese of Pensacola–Tallahassee, along with support from bishop representatives in the dioceses of St. Augustine, St. Petersburg, Orlando, Palm Beach and Venice. The United States Conference of Catholic Bishops has also endorsed the cause.

Luis Cáncer 

Luis Cáncer OP is regarded by the cause organizers as the proto-martyr of Florida. In 1860, Bishop Augustín Verot decided that the first parish on Florida's west coast should be named St. Louis Church in his honor. Likewise, in 1918 Fr. de Cáncer's likeness was installed as part of a large stained glass window at the Church of St. Vincent Ferrer (New York) run by the Dominican Order of priests. 

In 1998 the Diocese of St. Petersburg established the Fr. Luis de Cáncer Distinguished Priestly Service Award to be given annually to a priest of the Diocese of St. Petersburg who best exemplifies selfless and dedicated service to the people of God. Espíritu Santo Catholic Church in Safety Harbor, Florida, which is not far from the location of his death, also has a stained glass window that depicts de Cáncer's martyrdom. In 2011, the diocese placed a Catholic Heritage Marker at the main entrance of that church, acknowledging both his and other early Catholic missionary efforts in the Tampa Bay area.

Shrine 
A shrine for the Martyrs of La Florida is being planned for a stretch of land in Tallahassee, Florida, with the designs completed in 2022 by Cram and Ferguson Architects.

References

External links 

 Official website

Venerated Catholics
Servants of God
Jesuit Servants of God
Dominican Servants of God
Spanish venerated Catholics
History of North America
Spanish Roman Catholics
Native American Roman Catholics
Catholic martyrs
Catholic martyrs of the Early Modern era